Marquis Su may refer to:

Marquis Xian of Jin (died 812 BC), or Marquis Su according to recent archaeological evidence 
Marquess Su of Zhao (died 326 BC)

Three Kingdoms period and Jin dynasty
Cheng Yu (141–220), Cao Wei politician
Jia Xu (147–223), Cao Wei politician
Zhang Ji (Derong) (died 223), Cao Wei politician
Jia Kui (general) (174–228), Cao Wei politician
Xin Pi (died 235), Cao Wei politician
Gu Yong (168–243), Eastern Wu politician
Wang Guan (Three Kingdoms) (died 260), Cao Wei politician
Yu Yi (305–345), Jin dynasty general